Wakhan River; known locally as Ab-i-Wakhan or Abe Vâxân, Вахондарё and Vaxondaryo) is the name of the Sarhadd branch of the Panj River along its upper length in the Wakhan District of Badakhshan Province of Afghanistan.

The river arises in the Hindu Kush. It is formed by the confluence of the Wakhjir River and the Bozai River near Kashch Goz and Bozai Gumbaz, some 40 km west of the Wakhjir Pass. Shortly thereafter, the Little Pamir comes to an end, and the conjoined river contracts into a narrow, deep, rapid river, delimited by cliffs and steep hills. From here the banks have grown birch and juniper trees. 40 km west at Sarhad-e Broghil the river flows in a dramatic basin 3 km wide.  Little if any vegetation but dwarf willow grows in the area.

At Sarhadd the river contracts into a wider valley, which is more populated. The river emerges near the village of Qila-e Panj, where it is joined by the Pamir River. From that point the river is always locally spoken of as the Panj River.

See alsso
List of rivers in Afghanistan

References

Rivers of Afghanistan
Wakhan
Landforms of Badakhshan Province